The United Nations Security Council (UNSC) is one of the six principal organs of the United Nations (UN) and is charged with ensuring international peace and security, recommending the admission of new UN members to the General Assembly, and approving any changes to the UN Charter. Its powers include establishing peacekeeping operations, enacting international sanctions, and authorizing military action. The UNSC is the only UN body with the authority to issue binding resolutions on member states.

Like the UN as a whole, the Security Council was created after World War II to address the failings of the League of Nations in maintaining world peace. It held its first session on 17 January 1946 but was largely paralyzed in the following decades by the Cold War between the United States and the Soviet Union (and their allies). Nevertheless, it authorized military interventions in the Korean War and the Congo Crisis and peacekeeping missions in Cyprus, West New Guinea, and the Sinai Peninsula. With the collapse of the Soviet Union, UN peacekeeping efforts increased dramatically in scale, with the Security Council authorizing major military and peacekeeping missions in Kuwait, Namibia, Cambodia, Bosnia and Herzegovina, Rwanda, Somalia, Sudan, and the Democratic Republic of the Congo.

The Security Council consists of fifteen members, of which five are permanent: China, France, Russia, the United Kingdom, and the United States. These were the great powers that were the victors of World War II (or their successor states). Permanent members can veto (block) any substantive Security Council resolution, including those on the admission of new member states to the United Nations or nominees for the office of Secretary-General. This veto right does not carry over into any General Assembly or emergency special sessions of the General Assembly matters or votes. The other ten members are elected on a regional basis for a term of two years. The body's presidency rotates monthly among its members.

Resolutions of the Security Council are typically enforced by UN peacekeepers, which consist of military forces voluntarily provided by member states and funded independently of the main UN budget. , there have been 12 peacekeeping missions with over 87,000 personnel from 121 countries, with a total budget of approximately $6.3 billion.

History

Background and creation 

In the century prior to the UN's creation, several international treaty organizations and conferences had been formed to regulate conflicts between nations, such as the International Committee of the Red Cross and the Hague Conventions of 1899 and 1907. Following the catastrophic loss of life in World War I, the Paris Peace Conference established the League of Nations to maintain harmony between the nations. This organization successfully resolved some territorial disputes and created international structures for areas such as postal mail, aviation, and opium control, some of which would later be absorbed into the UN. However, the League lacked representation for colonial peoples (then half the world's population) and significant participation from several major powers, including the US, the USSR, Germany, and Japan; it failed to act against the 1931 Japanese invasion of Manchuria, the Second Italo-Ethiopian War in 1935, the 1937 Japanese occupation of China, and Nazi expansions under Adolf Hitler that escalated into World War II.

On New Year's Day 1942, President Roosevelt, Prime Minister Churchill, Maxim Litvinov, of the USSR, and T. V. Soong, of the Republic of China, signed a short document, based on the Atlantic Charter and the London Declaration, which later came to be known as the United Nations Declaration. The next day the representatives of twenty-two other nations added their signatures." The term United Nations was first officially used when 26 governments signed this Declaration. By 1 March 1945, 21 additional states had signed. "Four Powers" was coined to refer to the four major Allied countries: the United States, the United Kingdom, the Soviet Union and the Republic of China. and became the foundation of an executive branch of the United Nations, the Security Council.

Following the 1943 Moscow Conference and Tehran Conference, in mid-1944, the delegations from the Allied "Big Four", the Soviet Union, the UK, the US and the Republic of China, met for the Dumbarton Oaks Conference in Washington, D.C. to negotiate the UN's structure, and the composition of the UN Security Council quickly became the dominant issue. France, the Republic of China, the Soviet Union, the UK and US were selected as permanent members of the Security Council; the US attempted to add Brazil as a sixth member but was opposed by the heads of the Soviet and British delegations. The most contentious issue at Dumbarton and in successive talks proved to be the veto rights of permanent members. The Soviet delegation argued that each nation should have an absolute veto that could block matters from even being discussed, while the British argued that nations should not be able to veto resolutions on disputes to which they were a party. At the Yalta Conference of February 1945, the American, British and Russian delegations agreed that each of the "Big Five" could veto any action by the council, but not procedural resolutions, meaning that the permanent members could not prevent debate on a resolution.

On 25 April 1945, the UN Conference on International Organization began in San Francisco, attended by 50 governments and a number of non-governmental organizations involved in drafting the United Nations Charter. At the conference, H. V. Evatt of the Australian delegation pushed to further restrict the veto power of Security Council permanent members. Due to the fear that rejecting the strong veto would cause the conference's failure, his proposal was defeated twenty votes to ten.

The UN officially came into existence on 24 October 1945 upon ratification of the Charter by the five then-permanent members of the Security Council and by a majority of the other 46 signatories. On 17 January 1946, the Security Council met for the first time at Church House, Westminster, in London, United Kingdom. Subsequently, during the 1946-1951 period it conducted sessions at the United Nation's interim headquarters in Lake Success, New York, which were televised live on CBS by the journalist Edmund Chester in 1949.

Cold War 

The Security Council was largely paralyzed in its early decades by the Cold War between the US and USSR and their allies and the Council generally was only able to intervene in unrelated conflicts. (A notable exception was the 1950 Security Council resolution authorizing a US-led coalition to repel the North Korean invasion of South Korea, passed in the absence of the USSR.) In 1956, the first UN peacekeeping force was established to end the Suez Crisis; however, the UN was unable to intervene against the USSR's simultaneous invasion of Hungary following that country's revolution. Cold War divisions also paralysed the Security Council's Military Staff Committee, which had been formed by Articles 45–47 of the UN Charter to oversee UN forces and create UN military bases. The committee continued to exist on paper but largely abandoned its work in the mid-1950s.

In 1960, the UN deployed the United Nations Operation in the Congo (UNOC), the largest military force of its early decades, to restore order to the breakaway State of Katanga, restoring it to the control of the Democratic Republic of the Congo by 1964. However, the Security Council found itself bypassed in favour of direct negotiations between the superpowers in some of the decade's larger conflicts, such as the Cuban Missile Crisis or the Vietnam War. Focusing instead on smaller conflicts without an immediate Cold War connection, the Security Council deployed the United Nations Temporary Executive Authority in West New Guinea in 1962 and the United Nations Peacekeeping Force in Cyprus in 1964, the latter of which would become one of the UN's longest-running peacekeeping missions.

On 25 October 1971, over US opposition, but with the support of many Third World nations, along with the Socialist People's Republic of Albania, the mainland, communist People's Republic of China was given the Chinese seat on the Security Council in place of the Republic of China; the vote was widely seen as a sign of waning US influence in the organization. With an increasing Third World presence and the failure of UN mediation in conflicts in the Middle East, Vietnam and Kashmir, the UN increasingly shifted its attention to its ostensibly secondary goals of economic development and cultural exchange. By the 1970s, the UN budget for social and economic development was far greater than its budget for peacekeeping.

Post-Cold War 

After the Cold War, the UN saw a radical expansion in its peacekeeping duties, taking on more missions in ten years than it had in its previous four decades. Between 1988 and 2000, the number of adopted Security Council resolutions more than doubled, and the peacekeeping budget increased more than tenfold. The UN negotiated an end to the Salvadoran Civil War, launched a successful peacekeeping mission in Namibia, and oversaw democratic elections in post-apartheid South Africa and post-Khmer Rouge Cambodia. In 1991, the Security Council demonstrated its renewed vigor by condemning the Iraqi invasion of Kuwait on the same day of the attack and later authorizing a US-led coalition that successfully repulsed the Iraqis. Undersecretary-General Brian Urquhart later described the hopes raised by these successes as a "false renaissance" for the organization, given the more troubled missions that followed.

Though the UN Charter had been written primarily to prevent aggression by one nation against another, in the early 1990s, the UN faced a number of simultaneous, serious crises within nations such as Haiti, Mozambique and the former Yugoslavia. The UN mission to Bosnia faced "worldwide ridicule" for its indecisive and confused mission in the face of ethnic cleansing. In 1994, the United Nations Assistance Mission for Rwanda failed to intervene in the Rwandan genocide in the face of Security Council indecision.

In the late 1990s, UN-authorized international interventions took a wider variety of forms. The UN mission in the 1991–2002 Sierra Leone Civil War was supplemented by British Royal Marines and the UN-authorized 2001 invasion of Afghanistan was overseen by NATO. In 2003, the US invaded Iraq despite failing to pass a UN Security Council resolution for authorization, prompting a new round of questioning of the organization's effectiveness. In the same decade, the Security Council intervened with peacekeepers in crises including the War in Darfur in Sudan and the Kivu conflict in the Democratic Republic of Congo. In 2013, an internal review of UN actions in the final battles of the Sri Lankan Civil War in 2009 concluded that the organization had suffered "systemic failure".
In November/December 2014, Egypt presented a motion proposing an expansion of the NPT (non-Proliferation Treaty), to include Israel and Iran; this proposal was due to increasing hostilities and destruction in the Middle-East connected to the Syrian Conflict as well as others. All members of the Security Council are signatory to the NPT, and all permanent members are nuclear weapons states.

Role 

The UN's role in international collective security is defined by the UN Charter, which authorizes the Security Council to investigate any situation threatening international peace; recommend procedures for peaceful resolution of a dispute; call upon other member nations to completely or partially interrupt economic relations as well as sea, air, postal and radio communications, or to sever diplomatic relations; and enforce its decisions militarily, or by any means necessary. The Security Council also recommends the new Secretary-General to the General Assembly and recommends new states for admission as member states of the United Nations. The Security Council has traditionally interpreted its mandate as covering only military security, though US Ambassador Richard Holbrooke controversially persuaded the body to pass a resolution on HIV/AIDS in Africa in 2000.

Under Chapter VI of the Charter, "Pacific Settlement of Disputes", the Security Council "may investigate any dispute, or any situation which might lead to international friction or give rise to a dispute". The Council may "recommend appropriate procedures or methods of adjustment" if it determines that the situation might endanger international peace and security. These recommendations are generally considered to not be binding, as they lack an enforcement mechanism. A minority of scholars, such as Stephen Zunes, have argued that resolutions made under Chapter VI are "still directives by the Security Council and differ only in that they do not have the same stringent enforcement options, such as the use of military force".

Under Chapter VII, the council has broader power to decide what measures are to be taken in situations involving "threats to the peace, breaches of the peace, or acts of aggression." In such situations, the council is not limited to recommendations but may take action, including the use of armed force "to maintain or restore international peace and security." This was the legal basis for UN armed action in Korea in 1950 during the Korean War and the use of coalition forces in Iraq and Kuwait in 1991 and Libya in 2011. Decisions taken under Chapter VII, such as economic sanctions, are binding on UN members; the Security Council is the only UN body with authority to issue binding resolutions.

The Rome Statute of the International Criminal Court recognizes that the Security Council has authority to refer cases to the Court in which the Court could not otherwise exercise jurisdiction. The Council exercised this power for the first time in March 2005, when it referred to the Court "the situation prevailing in Darfur since 1 July 2002"; since Sudan is not a party to the Rome Statute, the Court could not otherwise have exercised jurisdiction. The Security Council made its second such referral in February 2011 when it asked the ICC to investigate the Libyan government's violent response to the Libyan Civil War.

Security Council Resolution 1674, adopted on 28 April 2006, "reaffirms the provisions of paragraphs 138 and 139 of the 2005 World Summit Outcome Document regarding the responsibility to protect populations from genocide, war crimes, ethnic cleansing and crimes against humanity". The Security Council reaffirmed this responsibility to protect in Resolution 1706 on 31 August of that year. These resolutions commit the Security Council to protect civilians in an armed conflict, including taking action against genocide, war crimes, ethnic cleansing and crimes against humanity.

Members

Permanent members 

The Security Council's five permanent members, below, have the power to veto any substantive resolution; this allows a permanent member to block adoption of a resolution, but not to prevent or end debate.

At the UN's founding in 1945, the five permanent members of the Security Council were the Republic of China, the Provisional Government of the French Republic, the Soviet Union, the United Kingdom and the United States. There have been two major seat changes since then. China's seat was originally held by Chiang Kai-shek's Nationalist Government, the Republic of China. However, the Nationalists were forced to retreat to the island of Taiwan in 1949, during the Chinese Civil War. The Chinese Communist Party assumed control of mainland China, thenceforth known as the People's Republic of China. In 1971, General Assembly Resolution 2758 recognized the People's Republic as the rightful representative of China in the UN and gave it the seat on the Security Council that had been held by the Republic of China, which was expelled from the UN altogether with no opportunity for membership as a separate nation. After the dissolution of the Soviet Union in 1991, the Russian Federation was recognized as the legal successor state of the Soviet Union and maintained the latter's position on the Security Council. Additionally, France eventually reformed its government into the French Fifth Republic in 1958, under the leadership of Charles de Gaulle. France maintained its seat as there was no change in its international status or recognition, although many of its overseas possessions eventually became independent.

The five permanent members of the Security Council were the victorious powers in World War II and have maintained the world's most powerful military forces ever since. They annually topped the list of countries with the highest military expenditures. In 2013, they spent over US$1 trillion combined on defence, accounting for over 55% of global military expenditures (the US alone accounting for over 35%). They are also among the world's largest arms exporters and are the only nations officially recognized as "nuclear-weapon states" under the Nuclear Non-Proliferation Treaty (NPT), though there are other states known or believed to be in possession of nuclear weapons.

The block of Western democratic and generally aligned permanent members (France, the UK and the US) is styled as the "P3".

Veto power 

Under Article 27 of the UN Charter, Security Council decisions on all substantive matters require the affirmative votes of three-fifths (i.e. nine) of the members. A negative vote or a "veto" by a permanent member prevents adoption of a proposal, even if it has received the required votes. Abstention is not regarded as a veto in most cases, though all five permanent members must vote for adopting any amendment of the UN Charter or any recommendation of the admission of a new UN member state. Procedural matters cannot be vetoed, so the veto right cannot be used to avoid discussion of an issue. The same holds for certain decisions that directly regard permanent members. Most vetoes have been used for blocking a candidate for Secretary-General or the admission of a member state, not in critical international security situations.

In the negotiations leading up to the creation of the UN, the veto power was opposed by many small countries and was in fact forced on them by the veto nations—the United States, the United Kingdom, China, France, and the Soviet Union—by threatening that the UN would otherwise not be founded. Here is a description of the situation by Francis O. Wilcox, an adviser to the US delegation to the 1945 conference:

, 269 vetoes had been cast since the Security Council's inception. In this period, China used the veto 9 times, France 18, the Soviet Union or Russia 128, the United Kingdom 32, and the United States 89. Roughly two-thirds of Soviet and Russian combined vetoes were in the first ten years of the Security Council's existence. Between 1996 and 2012,
the United States vetoed 13 resolutions, Russia 7, and China 5, while France and the United Kingdom did not use the veto.

An early veto by Soviet Commissar Andrei Vishinsky blocked a resolution on the withdrawal of French forces from the then-colonies of Syria and Lebanon in February 1946; this veto established the precedent that permanent members could use the veto on matters outside of immediate concerns of war and peace. The Soviet Union went on to veto matters including the admission of Austria, Cambodia, Ceylon, Finland, Ireland, Italy, Japan, Laos, Libya, Nepal, Portugal, South Vietnam and Transjordan as UN member states, delaying their joining by several years. The United Kingdom and France used the veto to avoid Security Council condemnation of their actions in the 1956 Suez Crisis. The first veto by the United States came in 1970, blocking General Assembly action in Southern Rhodesia. From 1985 to 1990, the US vetoed 27 resolutions, primarily to block resolutions perceived as anti-Israel but also to protect its interests in Panama and Korea. The Soviet Union, the United States and China have all vetoed candidates for Secretary-General, with the US using the veto to block the re-election of Boutros Boutros-Ghali in 1996.

Non-permanent members 

Along with the five permanent members, the Security Council of the United Nations has temporary members that hold their seats on a rotating basis by geographic region. Non-permanent members may be involved in global security briefings. In its first two decades, the Security Council had six non-permanent members, the first of which were Australia, Brazil, Egypt, Mexico, the Netherlands and Poland. In 1965, the number of non-permanent members was expanded to ten.

These ten non-permanent members are elected by the United Nations General Assembly for two-year terms starting on 1 January, with five replaced each year. To be approved, a candidate must receive at least two-thirds of all votes cast for that seat, which can result in deadlock if there are two roughly evenly matched candidates. In 1979, a standoff between Cuba and Colombia only ended after three months and a record 154 rounds of voting; both eventually withdrew in favour of Mexico as a compromise candidate. A retiring member is not eligible for immediate re-election.

The African Group is represented by three members; the Latin America and the Caribbean, Asia-Pacific, and Western European and Others groups by two apiece; and the Eastern European Group by one. Traditionally, one of the seats assigned to either the Asia-Pacific Group or the African Group is filled by a nation from the Arab world, alternating between the groups. Currently, elections for terms beginning in even-numbered years select two African members, and one each within Eastern Europe, Asia-Pacific, and Latin America and the Caribbean; the traditional "Arab seat" is elected for this term. Terms beginning in odd-numbered years consist of two Western European and Other members, and one each from Asia-Pacific, Africa, and Latin America and the Caribbean.

During the 2016 United Nations Security Council election, neither Italy nor the Netherlands met the required two-thirds majority for election. They subsequently agreed to split the term of the Western European and Others Group. It was the first time in over five decades that two members agreed to do so. Usually, intractable deadlocks are resolved by the candidate countries withdrawing in favour of a third member state.

The current elected members, with the regions they were elected to represent, are as follows:

President 

The role of president of the Security Council involves setting the agenda, presiding at its meetings and overseeing any crisis. The president is authorized to issue both Presidential Statements (subject to consensus among Council members) and notes, which are used to make declarations of intent that the full Security Council can then pursue. The presidency of the council is held by each of the members in turn for one month, following the English alphabetical order of the member states' names.

The list of nations that will hold the Presidency in 2023 is as follows:

Meeting locations 

Unlike the General Assembly, the Security Council is not bound to sessions. Each Security Council member must have a representative available at UN Headquarters at all times in case an emergency meeting becomes necessary.

The Security Council generally meets in a designated chamber in the United Nations Conference Building in New York City. The chamber was designed by the Norwegian architect Arnstein Arneberg and was a gift from Norway. The United Nations Security Council mural by Norwegian artist Per Krohg (1952) depicts a phoenix rising from its ashes, symbolic of the world's rebirth after World War II.

The Security Council has also held meetings in cities including Nairobi, Kenya; Addis Ababa, Ethiopia; Panama City, Panama; and Geneva, Switzerland. In March 2010, the Security Council moved into a temporary facility in the General Assembly Building as its chamber underwent renovations as part of the UN Capital Master Plan. The renovations were funded by Norway, the chamber's original donor, for a total cost of 5 million. The chamber reopened on 16 April 2013. The representatives of the member states are seated on a horseshoe-shaped table, with the president in the very middle flanked by the Secretary on the right and the Undersecretary on the left. The other representatives are placed in clockwise order alphabetically from the president leaving two seats at the ends of the table for guest speakers. The seating order of the members is then rotated each month as the presidency changes.

Because of the public nature of meetings in the Security Council Chamber delegations use the chamber to voice their positions in different ways, such as for example with walkouts.

Consultation room 
Due to the public scrutiny of the Security Council Chamber, much of the work of the Security Council is conducted behind closed doors in "informal consultations".

In 1978, West Germany funded the construction of a conference room next to the Security Council Chamber. The room was used for "informal consultations", which soon became the primary meeting format for the Security Council. In 1994, the French ambassador complained to the Secretary-General that "informal consultations have become the Council's characteristic working method, while public meetings, originally the norm, are increasingly rare and increasingly devoid of content: everyone knows that when the Council goes into public meeting everything has been decided in advance". When Russia funded the renovation of the consultation room in 2013, the Russian ambassador called it "quite simply, the most fascinating place in the entire diplomatic universe".

Only members of the Security Council are permitted in the conference room for consultations. The press is not admitted, and other members of the United Nations cannot be invited into the consultations. No formal record is kept of the informal consultations. As a result, the delegations can negotiate with each other in secret, striking deals and compromises without having their every word transcribed into the permanent record. The privacy of the conference room also makes it possible for the delegates to deal with each other in a friendly manner. In one early consultation, a new delegate from a Communist nation began a propaganda attack on the United States, only to be told by the Soviet delegate, "We don't talk that way in here."

A permanent member can cast a "pocket veto" during the informal consultation by declaring its opposition to a measure. Since a veto would prevent the resolution from being passed, the sponsor will usually refrain from putting the resolution to a vote. Resolutions are vetoed only if the sponsor feels so strongly about a measure that it wishes to force the permanent member to cast a formal veto. By the time a resolution reaches the Security Council Chamber, it has already been discussed, debated and amended in the consultations. The open meeting of the Security Council is merely a public ratification of a decision that has already been reached in private. For example, Resolution 1373 was adopted without public debate in a meeting that lasted just five minutes.

The Security Council holds far more consultations than public meetings. In 2012, the Security Council held 160 consultations, 16 private meetings and 9 public meetings. In times of crisis, the Security Council still meets primarily in consultations, but it also holds more public meetings. After the outbreak of the Russo-Ukrainian War in 2014, the Security Council returned to the patterns of the Cold War, as Russia and the Western countries engaged in verbal duels in front of the television cameras. In 2016, the Security Council held 150 consultations, 19 private meetings and 68 public meetings.

Subsidiary organs/bodies 
Article 29 of the Charter provides that the Security Council can establish subsidiary bodies in order to perform its functions. This authority is also reflected in Rule 28 of the Provisional Rules of Procedure. The subsidiary bodies established by the Security Council are extremely heterogenous. On the one hand, they include bodies such as the Security Council Committee on Admission of New Members. On the other hand, both the International Criminal Tribunal for the former Yugoslavia and the International Criminal Tribunal for Rwanda were also created as subsidiary bodies of the Security Council. The by now numerous Sanctions Committees established in order to oversee implementation of the various sanctions regimes are also subsidiary bodies of the council.

United Nations peacekeepers 

After approval by the Security Council, the UN may send peacekeepers to regions where armed conflict has recently ceased or paused to enforce the terms of peace agreements and to discourage combatants from resuming hostilities. Since the UN does not maintain its own military, peacekeeping forces are voluntarily provided by member states. These soldiers are sometimes nicknamed "Blue Helmets" for their distinctive gear. The peacekeeping force as a whole received the Nobel Peace Prize in 1988.

In September 2013, the UN had 116,837 peacekeeping soldiers and other personnel deployed on 15 missions. The largest was the United Nations Organization Stabilization Mission in the Democratic Republic of the Congo (MONUSCO), which included 20,688 uniformed personnel. The smallest, United Nations Military Observer Group in India and Pakistan (UNMOGIP), included 42 uniformed personnel responsible for monitoring the ceasefire in Jammu and Kashmir. Peacekeepers with the United Nations Truce Supervision Organization (UNTSO) have been stationed in the Middle East since 1948, the longest-running active peacekeeping mission.

UN peacekeepers have also drawn criticism in several postings. Peacekeepers have been accused of child rape, soliciting prostitutes, or sexual abuse during various peacekeeping missions in the Democratic Republic of the Congo, Haiti, Liberia, Sudan and what is now South Sudan, Burundi and Ivory Coast. Scientists cited UN peacekeepers from Nepal as the likely source of the 2010–2013 Haiti cholera outbreak, which killed more than 8,000 Haitians following the 2010 Haiti earthquake.

The budget for peacekeeping is assessed separately from the main UN organisational budget; in the 2013–2014 fiscal year, peacekeeping expenditures totalled $7.54 billion. UN peace operations are funded by assessments, using a formula derived from the regular funding scale, but including a weighted surcharge for the five permanent Security Council members. This surcharge serves to offset discounted peacekeeping assessment rates for less developed countries. In 2020, the top 10 providers of assessed financial contributions to United Nations peacekeeping operations were the US (27.89%), China (15.21%), Japan (8.56%), Germany (6.09%), the United Kingdom (5.79%), France (5.61%), Italy (3.30%), Russian Federation (3.04%), Canada (2.73%) and South Korea (2.26%).

Criticism and evaluations 

In examining the first sixty years of the Security Council's existence, British historian Paul Kennedy concludes that "glaring failures had not only accompanied the UN's many achievements, they overshadowed them", identifying the lack of will to prevent ethnic massacres in Bosnia and Rwanda as particular failures. Kennedy attributes the failures to the UN's lack of reliable military resources, writing that "above all, one can conclude that the practice of announcing (through a Security Council resolution) a new peacekeeping mission without ensuring that sufficient armed forces will be available has usually proven to be a recipe for humiliation and disaster".

Several studies have examined the Security Council's responsiveness to armed conflict. Findings suggests that the Council is more likely to meet and deliberate on conflicts that are more intense and lead to more humanitarian suffering, but that its responsiveness is also shaped by the political interests of member states and in particular of the permanent members. 

A 2005 RAND Corporation study found the UN to be successful in two out of three peacekeeping efforts. It compared UN nation-building efforts to those of the United States, and found that 88% of UN cases lead to lasting peace. Also in 2005, the Human Security Report documented a decline in the number of wars, genocides and human rights abuses since the end of the Cold War, and presented evidence, albeit circumstantial, that international activism—mostly spearheaded by the UN—has been the main cause of the decline in armed conflict since the end of the Cold War.

Scholar Sudhir Chella Rajan argued in 2006 that the five permanent members of the United Nations Security Council, who are all nuclear powers, have created an exclusive nuclear club that predominantly addresses the strategic interests and political motives of the permanent members—for example, protecting the oil-rich Kuwaitis in 1991 but poorly protecting resource-poor Rwandans in 1994. Since three of the five permanent members are European, and four are predominantly white developed nations, the Security Council has been described as a pillar of global apartheid by Titus Alexander, former Chair of Westminster United Nations Association.

The Security Council's effectiveness and relevance is questioned by some because, in most high-profile cases, there are essentially no consequences for violating a Security Council resolution. During the Darfur crisis, Janjaweed militias, allowed by elements of the Sudanese government, committed violence against an indigenous population, killing thousands of civilians. In the Srebrenica massacre, Serbian troops committed genocide against Bosniaks, although Srebrenica had been declared a UN safe area, protected by 400 armed Dutch peacekeepers.

In his 2009 speech, Muammar Gaddafi criticized the Security Council's veto powers and the wars permanent members of the Security Council engaged in.

The UN Charter gives all three powers of the legislative, executive and judiciary branches to the Security Council.

In his inaugural speech at the 16th Summit of the Non-Aligned Movement in August 2012, Ayatollah Ali Khamenei criticized the United Nations Security Council as having an "illogical, unjust and completely undemocratic structure and mechanism" and called for a complete reform of the body.

The Security Council has been criticized for failure in resolving many conflicts, including Cyprus, Sri Lanka, Syria, Kosovo, and the Israeli–Palestinian conflict, reflecting the wider short-comings of the UN.
For example; at the 68th Session of the UN General Assembly, New Zealand Prime Minister John Key heavily criticized the UN's inaction on Syria, more than two years after the Syrian civil war began.

There is evidence of bribery on the UNSC. Countries that are elected to the Security Council see a large increase in foreign aid from the US, averaging 59%. They also see an 8% increase in aid from the United Nations, mainly from UNICEF. The increase most strongly correlates to years in which the Security Council addresses issues relevant to the US. There is also evidence of increased foreign aid to elected countries from Japan and Germany. One study found membership on the UNSC correlates with reduced economic growth for a given country over the course of its two-year term: 3.5% growth during membership compared to 8.7% over four years of non-membership, although the effect is mainly driven by African authoritarian countries. Elected members also experience a reduction in democracy and freedom of the press.

Membership reform 

Proposals to reform the Security Council began with the conference that wrote the UN Charter and have continued to the present day. As British historian Paul Kennedy writes, "Everyone agrees that the present structure is flawed. But consensus on how to fix it remains out of reach."

There has been discussion of increasing the number of permanent members. The countries which have made the strongest demands for permanent seats are Brazil, Germany, India and Japan. Japan and Germany, the main defeated powers in WWII, had been the UN's second- and third-largest funders, respectively, before China took over as the second largest funder in recent years, while Brazil and India are two of the largest contributors of troops to UN-mandated peace-keeping missions.

Italy, another main defeated power in WWII and now the UN's sixth-largest funder, leads a movement known as the Uniting for Consensus in opposition to the possible expansion of permanent seats. Core members of the group include Canada, South Korea, Spain, Indonesia, Mexico, Pakistan, Turkey, Argentina and Colombia. Their proposal is to create a new category of seats, still non-permanent, but elected for an extended duration (semi-permanent seats). As far as traditional categories of seats are concerned, the UfC proposal does not imply any change, but only the introduction of small and medium size states among groups eligible for regular seats. This proposal includes even the question of veto, giving a range of options that goes from abolition to limitation of the application of the veto only to Chapter VII matters.

Former UN Secretary-General Kofi Annan asked a team of advisers to come up with recommendations for reforming the United Nations by the end of 2004. One proposed measure is to increase the number of permanent members by five, which, in most proposals, would include Brazil, Germany, India and Japan (known as the G4 nations), one seat from Africa (most likely between Egypt, Nigeria or South Africa), and/or one seat from the Arab League. On 21 September 2004, the G4 nations issued a joint statement mutually backing each other's claim to permanent status, together with two African countries. Currently the proposal has to be accepted by two-thirds of the General Assembly (128 votes).

The permanent members, each holding the right of veto, announced their positions on Security Council reform reluctantly. The United States has unequivocally supported the permanent membership of Japan and lent its support to India and a small number of additional non-permanent members. The United Kingdom and France essentially supported the G4 position, with the expansion of permanent and non-permanent members and the accession of Germany, Brazil, India and Japan to permanent member status, as well as an increase in the presence by African countries on the council. China has supported the stronger representation of developing countries and firmly opposed Japan's membership.

In 2017, it was reported that the G4 nations were willing temporarily to forgo veto power if granted permanent UNSC seats. In September 2017, US Representatives Ami Bera and Frank Pallone introduced a resolution (H.Res.535) in the US House of Representatives (115th United States Congress), seeking support for India for permanent membership of the United Nations Security Council and India should be a permanent member which will represent 1.4 billion people at the United Nations.

See also 
 Reform of the United Nations
 Small Five Group, a group formed to improve the working methods of the Security Council
 United Nations Department of Political and Peacebuilding Affairs, provides secretarial support to the Security Council
 United Nations Security Council Counter-Terrorism Committee, a standing committee of the Security Council

Notes

References

Citations

Sources

Further reading

External links 

 
 UN Security Council Research Guide
 Global Policy Forum – UN Security Council
 Security Council Report – information and analysis on the council's activities
 What's In Blue – a series of insights on evolving Security Council actions
 Center for UN Reform Education – information on current reform issues at the United Nations
 UN Democracy: hyperlinked transcripts of the United Nations General Assembly and the Security Council

 
United Nations organs
International security
Organizations established in 1946